The 1948–49 Southern Football League season was the 46th in the history of the league, an English football competition. 

The league consisted of 22 clubs, including all 18 clubs from the previous season, and four newly elected clubs.

Hastings United, a new club
Kidderminster Harriers, joined from the Birmingham & District League
Tonbridge, a new club
Chingford Town, a new club

Gillingham were champions, winning their second Southern League title. Four Southern League clubs applied to join the Football League at the end of the season, but none was successful.

League table

Football League elections
Eight Southern League clubs applied to join the Football League, but all four League clubs were re-elected.

References

Southern Football League seasons
S